WOA may refer to:


Computing 
 Web-oriented architecture, a computer systems architectural style
 Windows on ARM (disambiguation), a series of operating systems for ARM architecture computers
 WebObjects application, the file system suffix of an application written using the WebObjects framework from NeXT, later Apple

Wars 
 War of Attrition, a conflict between Israel and Egypt
 War of aggression

Music 
 Wacken Open Air, the largest exclusively metal music festival in the world
 War of Ages, metalcore band from Pennsylvania
 W.O.A Records of India and Dubai

Sports 
 World Olympians Association
 Welsh Orienteering Association

Other uses 
 World Ocean Atlas
 World of Art, a series of books on art
 the ICAO airline designator for World Airways